The 2009 Big 12 Conference women's soccer tournament was the postseason women's soccer tournament for the Big 12 Conference held from November 4 to 8, 2009. The 8-match tournament was held at the Blossom Athletic Center in San Antonio, TX with a combined attendance of 6,750. The 9-team single-elimination tournament consisted of four rounds based on seeding from regular season conference play. The Oklahoma State Cowgirls defeated the Texas A&M Aggies in the championship match to win their 2nd conference tournament.

Regular season standings
Source:

Bracket

Awards

Most valuable player
Source:
Offensive MVP – Rachel Shipley – Texas A&M
Defensive MVP – Melinda Mercado – Oklahoma State

All-Tournament team

References 

 
Big 12 Conference Women's Soccer Tournament